Isabelle Simonis (born 4 March 1967) is a Belgian politician from the Socialist Party.

Simonis studied communication, and she was active in the socialist women's rights movement.

Political career
2003-2004: Secretary of state for family and persons with a handicap
2004: Chairperson of the Parliament of the French Community. She had to resign after a scandal about the use of public funds for projects with the objective to obtain the votes of migrants for her party
2004–present: Member of the Walloon Parliament and the Parliament of the French Community
2007–present: Mayor of Flémalle

References

External links 
 Official site

1967 births
Living people
People from Seraing
Socialist Party (Belgium) politicians
Socialist feminists
Members of the Parliament of the French Community
Members of the Parliament of Wallonia
Women mayors of places in Belgium
21st-century Belgian politicians
21st-century Belgian women politicians